Africanus Horton is a crater on Mercury. It was named by the IAU in 1976, after Africanus Horton, a Creole African nationalist writer and an esteemed medical surgeon in the British Army from Freetown, Sierra Leone.

References

Impact craters on Mercury